A vocation is an occupation to which a person is especially drawn or for which they are suited, trained or qualified. People can be given information about a new occupation through student orientation. Though now often used in non-religious contexts, the meanings of the term originated in Christianity.

Senses
Use of the word "vocation" before the sixteenth century referred firstly to the "call" by God to an individual, or calling of all humankind to salvation, particularly in the Vulgate, and more specifically to the "vocation" to the priesthood, or to the religious life, which is still the usual sense in Roman Catholicism. Roman Catholicism recognizes marriage, religious, and ordained life as the three vocations. Martin Luther, followed by John Calvin, placed a particular emphasis on vocations, or divine callings, as potentially including most secular occupations, though this idea was by no means new.

Calvinism developed complex ideas about different types of vocations of the first type, connected with the concepts of predestination, irresistible grace, and the elect. There are the vocatio universalis, the vocatio specialis, only extended to some. There were also complex distinctions between internal and external, and the "vocatio efficax" and "inefficax" types of callings.  Hyper-Calvinism rejects the idea of a "universal call", a vocation, to repent and believe, held by virtually all other Christian groups.

In Protestantism, the call from God to devote one's life to him by joining the clergy is often covered by the English equivalent term "call", whereas in Roman Catholicism "vocation" is still used.

Both senses of the word "call" are used in 1 Corinthians 7:20, where Paul says "Let every man abide in the same calling wherein he was called".

Concept

The idea of vocation is central to the Christian belief that God has created each person with gifts and talents oriented toward specific purposes and a way of life.  In the broadest sense, as stated in the Catechism of the Catholic Church, "Love is the fundamental and innate vocation of every human being".  More specifically, in the Eastern Orthodox and Catholic Churches, this idea of vocation is especially associated with a divine call to service to the Church and humanity through particular vocational life commitments such as marriage to a particular person, consecration as a religious dedication, ordination to priestly ministry in the Church and even a holy life as a single person.  In the broader sense, Christian vocation includes the use of one's gifts in their profession, family life, church and civic commitments for the sake of the greater common good.

Christian views on work
Many Christian theologians appeal to the Old Testament Book of Genesis in regards to work. According to Genesis 1, human beings were created in the image of God, and according to Genesis 2, Adam was placed in the Garden of Eden to "work it and keep it". Dorothy L. Sayers has argued that "work is the natural exercise and function of man – the creature who is made in the image of his Creator."  Likewise, John Paul II said in  that by his work, man shares in the image of his creator.

Christian theologians see the fall of man as profoundly affecting human work. In Genesis 3:17, God said to Adam, "cursed is the ground because of you; in pain you shall eat of it all the days of your life". Leland Ryken said out that, because of the fall, "many of the tasks we perform in a fallen world are inherently distasteful and wearisome." Christian theologians interpret that through the fall, work has become toil, but John Paul II says that work is a good thing for man in spite of this toil, and that "perhaps, in a sense, because of it", because work is something that corresponds to man's dignity and through it, he achieves fulfilment as a human being. The fall also means that a work ethic is needed. As a result of the fall, work has become subject to the abuses of idleness on the one hand, and overwork on the other. Drawing on Aristotle, Ryken suggests that the moral ideal is the golden mean between the two extremes of being lazy and being a workaholic.

Some Christian theologians also draw on the doctrine of redemption to discuss the concept of work. Oliver O'Donovan said that although work is a gift of creation, it is "ennobled into mutual service in the fellowship of Christ."

Ryken argues for seeing the call of God to a particular occupation as a reflection of the gospel call, and suggests that this implies vocational loyalty – "modern notions of job become deficient" and "the element of arbitrariness of one's choice of work" is removed.

Modern vocation

Since the establishment of Vocational Guidance in 1908 by the engineer Frank Parsons, the use of the term "vocation" has evolved, with emphasis shifting to an individual's development of talents and abilities in the choice and enjoyment of a career. This semantic expansion has meant some diminution of reference to the term's religious meanings in everyday usage.

Literary clarification
These books have attempted to define or clarify the term vocation.
States of the Christian life and vocation, according to the doctors and theologians of the Church by Jean-Baptiste Berthier
A Theology of the Laity by Hendrik Kraemer
Living Your Heart's Desire: God's Call and Your Vocation by Gregory S. Clapper
The Fabric of this World by Lee Hardy
Your Work Matters to God by Doug Sherman and William Hendricks
The Call by Os Guinness
The Preaching Life by Barbara Brown Taylor
Let Your Life Speak by Parker J. Palmer
Lay People in the Church: A Study for a Theology of the Laity by Yves M.J. Congar, O.P. Translated by Donald Attwater, 1959
Luther on Vocation by Gustaf Wingren, 1957
God at Work: Your Christian Vocation in All of Life by Gene Edward Veith Jr.
The Fabric of Faithfulness by Steven Garber
Visions of Vocation by Steven Garber

See also
 Anticipatory socialization
 Career and Life Planning Education
 Effectual calling
 List of largest employers
 
 Profession
 Religious calling
 Trade (occupation)
 Vocational discernment in the Catholic Church
 Vocational education

References

External links

 
Center for Applied Research in the Apostolate national, non-profit, Georgetown University affiliated research center that conducts social scientific studies about the Catholic Church.

Christian missions
Christian terminology
Christian religious occupations